Ida Carloni Talli (31 January 1860 – 23 April 1940) was an Italian film actress of the silent era. She appeared in 92 films between 1912 and 1924. She was born Rome and died in Milan. She made her debut as a stage actress in 1887.

Selected filmography
 Antony and Cleopatra (1913)
 Quo Vadis (1913)
 The Lady of the Camellias (1915)
 The Shadow of Her Past (1915)
 I Topi Grigi, starring Emilio Ghione
 The Sea of Naples (1919)
 Tortured Soul (1919)
Red Love (1921)
 The Prey (1921)
 The White Sister (1923)
 The Betrothed (1923)
 Consuelita (1925)

References

External links

1860 births
1940 deaths
20th-century Italian actresses
Italian stage actresses
Italian film actresses
Italian silent film actresses
19th-century Italian actresses